The Syriac Catholic Eparchy of Our Lady of Deliverance is a Syriac Catholic Church ecclesiastical territory or eparchy of the Catholic Church in the United States. The territory of the eparchy encompasses the entire United States. Its cathedral is St. Joseph Syriac Catholic Cathedral, in Bayonne, New Jersey, near the episcopal see of Newark. Yousif Benham Habash has led the eparchy since April 2010.

History 
Until 1995, Syriac Catholic congregations in the United States and Canada were under the ordinary jurisdiction of the local Latin Church bishops.

On November 6, 1995, Pope John Paul II erected the Eparchy of Our Lady of Deliverance, immediately subject to the Holy See, and appointed bishop Joseph Younan as the first eparch, with his see at Newark, New Jersey.

In 2009, Bishop Younan was elected as Primate of the Syriac Catholic Church and Patriarch of Antioch and all the East of the Syriacs. In 2010, Pope Benedict XVI appointed Bishop Yousif Benham Habash as the second eparch.

On January 7, 2016, it lost its (southeastern) Canadian territory (then five communities in Ontario and Quebec provinces) to the newly erected Syriac Catholic Apostolic Exarchate for Canada.

Episcopal ordinaries
''Eparchs (Bishops) of Our Lady of Deliverance of Newark 
 Joseph Younan (November 6, 1995 – January 20, 2009), later Patriarch of Antioch of the Syriacs (actually in Beirut, Lebanon) ([2009.01.20] 2009.01.22 – ...) and President of the Synod of the Syriac Catholic Church (2009.01.22 – ...)
 Yousif Benham Habash (April 12, 2010 – ...)

Current status 
As of 2016, the eparchy is estimated to have 16,000 faithful in 8 parishes and 6 missions.
 
Congregations are located in the following cities :

 East coast
 Allentown, Pennsylvania
 Bayonne, New Jersey
 Boston, Massachusetts
 Jacksonville, Florida
 Farmington Hills, Michigan 
 Sterling Heights, Michigan
 Northbrook, Illinois
 West coast
 El Cajon, California
 Los Angeles, California
 Oceanside, California 
 Phoenix, Arizona

See also

References

External links
 Syriac Catholic Eparchy of Our Lady of Deliverance of Newark

Assyrian-American culture in New Jersey
O
Eastern Catholic dioceses in North America
Our Lady of Deliverance of Newark
Catholicism in New Jersey
Our Lady of Deliverance of Newark
Our Lady of Deliverance of Newark
Iraqi-American history
Lebanese-American history
Syrian-American history